Bahar is a Hindustani classical raga. This raga is very similar (but still distinct) to raga Malhar. This raga is from the Kafi Thaat.

Theory
Writing about the musical theory of Indian classical music is fraught with complications due to complex and intricate nature. First of all, there have been no set, formal methods of written notation. Indian music is an aural tradition, and therefore writing is not an essential part of attaining talim (systematic study).

But in the recent years, a couple of methods of notation (swar leepi) the sheet music for Hindustani Classical Music have evolved. A prominent of them are BhatKhande Swar leepi (widely used in the present time) by Pt. VishnuNarayan BhatKhande,

Creator: Hzt Amir Khusrau

Arohana & Avarohana 
Arohana: 

Avarohana:

Vadi & Samvaadi 
Vadi: Ma

Samvadi: Sa

Jati  
Shadav - Sampurna

Thaat 
The Raag belongs to Kafi Thaat

Pakad or Chalan 
The bare scale of this raga has little unique musical meaning, and is, therefore, required to be documented in a manner that incorporates its zigzag phrasing pattern.

R N. S M/ M M P g M / n P M P g M/ P g M n D n P/ g M n D N S' [or] g M D - N S'/ g' M' R' S'/ R' N S' D n P/ n n P M P g M/ P g M R S

Organization & Relationships 
Related ragas: Shahana Kanada, Shahana Bahar, Basant Bahar, Adana Bahar
Thaat: Kafi

Samay (Time) 
The raag is sung at the Middle Night time.

Seasonality 
Certain ragas have seasonal associations. Raag Bahar is usually rendered in the Spring season

Rasa 
Since it is the raga of spring, it can be considered that the raga has shringara rasa.

Variants 
 Bageshri Bahar
 Basant Bahar
 Hindol Bahar
 Bhairav Bahar

Prominent Bandishes (Compositions) Set in Raag Bahar

Film Songs

Language: Tamil

Notes

References

Sources

External links
 SRA on Samay and Ragas
 SRA on Ragas and Thaats
 Rajan Parrikar on Ragas
 Film Songs in Rag Bahar

Hindustani ragas